Hawthorn Ridge Redoubt was a German field fortification, west of the village of Beaumont Hamel on the Somme. The redoubt was built after the end of the Battle of Albert (25–29 September 1914) and as French and later British attacks on the Western Front became more formidable, the Germans added fortifications and trench positions near the original lines around Hawthorn Ridge. At  on 1 July 1916, the British fired a huge mine beneath the Hawthorn Ridge Redoubt. Sprung ten minutes before zero hour, the mine was one of 19 mines detonated on the first day of the Battle of the Somme. Geoffrey Malins, one of two official war cameramen, filmed the detonation of the mine. The attack on the redoubt by part of the 29th Division of VIII Corps (Lieutenant-General Sir Aylmer Hunter-Weston) was a costly failure.

Hunter-Weston had ordered the mine to be fired early to protect the advancing infantry from falling debris but this also gave the Germans time to occupy the rear lip of the mine crater. When British parties advanced across no man's land to occupy the crater, they were engaged by German small-arms fire. A few British soldiers reached the objective but at noon they were ejected by a German counter-attack. The success of the German defence of the Hawthorn Ridge Redoubt crater contributed to the failure of the British attack on the rest of the VIII Corps front.

The British reopened the tunnel beneath the Hawthorn Ridge crater three days later and reloaded the mine with explosives for the Battle of the Ancre . The new mine was fired on 13 November in support of an attack on Beaumont-Hamel by the 51st (Highland) Division of V Corps. The Scottish infantry advanced from a trench  from the German lines, half the distance of 1 July, with the support of tanks, an accurate creeping barrage and an overhead machine-gun barrage. Beaumont-Hamel was captured and  prisoners taken.

Background

1914–1915

The 26th (Württemberg) Reserve Division  Franz von Soden) of the XIV Reserve Corps, arrived on the Somme in late September 1914, attempting to advance westwards towards Amiens. By 7 October, the advance had ended and temporary scrapes had been occupied. Fighting in the area from the Somme north to the Ancre, subsided into minor line-straightening attacks by both sides. Underground warfare began on the Somme front, which continued when the British Expeditionary Force (BEF) took over from the French Second Army at the end of July 1915. Miners brought from Germany late in 1914 tunnelled under Beaumont-Hamel and the vicinity to excavate shelters in which infantry companies could shelter and against which even heavy artillery could cause little damage.

On the Somme front, a construction plan of January 1915, by which Falkenhayn intended to provide the western armies with a means to economise on infantry, had been completed. The trenches were traversed and had sentry-posts in concrete recesses built into the parapet. Communication trenches ran back to the reserve line, renamed the second line, which was as well built and wired as the first line. The second line was built beyond the range of Allied field artillery, to force an attacker to stop and move field artillery forward before assaulting the line.

1915–1916
On New Year's Eve 1915, a small mine was sprung under Redan Ridge north of Beaumont-Hamel, followed by German mine explosions on  January. British mines were blown on  January 1916 and both sides sprung mines in February; the Germans then dug a defensive gallery parallel to the front line to prevent surprises. On the night of  a German raid by II Battalion, Reserve Infantry Regiment 119 (RIR 119) took place near Y Ravine, against the 2nd South Wales Borderers of the 29th Division and caused 112 casualties, for a loss of three killed and one man wounded. A big raid by the British on 30 April was seen by alert defenders and repulsed by small-arms fire and artillery as soon as it began. A report by the local German commander, showed that the preparations for the raid had been noticed a week before the attempt.

After the Second Battle of Champagne in 1915, construction of a third line another  back from the  had been begun in February 1916 and was nearly complete on the Somme front by 1 July. The Somme defences had two inherent weaknesses which the rebuilding had not remedied: The first was that the front trenches were on a forward slope, lined by white chalk from the subsoil and easily seen by ground observers.

Prelude

German preparations

The headwaters of the Ancre river flow west to Hamel through the Ancre valley, past Miraumont, Grandcourt, Beaucourt and St. Pierre Divion. On the north bank, pointing south-east, lie the Auchonvillers spur, with a lower area known as Hawthorn Ridge, Beaucourt spur descending from Colincamps and Grandcourt spur crowned with the village of Serre. Shallow valleys link the spurs, the village of Beaumont-Hamel lies in the valley between Auchonvillers and Beaucourt spurs. A branch in the valley known as Y Ravine lies on the side of Hawthorn Ridge. In 1916, the front of VIII Corps lay opposite the line from Beaucourt to Serre, facing the series of ridges and valleys, beyond the German positions to the east. The German front line ran along the eastern slope of Auchonvillers spur, round the west end of Y Ravine to Hawthorn Ridge, across the valley of Beaumont-Hamel to the part of Beaucourt spur known as Redan Ridge, to the top of the Beaucourt valley to Serre. An intermediate line known to the British as Munich Trench began at Beaucourt Redoubt and ran north to Serre. The second position ran from Grandcourt to Puisieux and the third position was  further back.

The ground was flat and unobstructed, except for a sunken road from the Auchonvillers–Beaumont-Hamel road and a low bank near the German front trench. The German front had several shallow salients, flanks, a bastion at the west end of Y Ravine and cover in the valleys to the east. Beaumont-Hamel commanded the valley, which the VIII Corps divisions were to cross and had been fortified. Beaucourt Ridge further back, gave a commanding view to German artillery observers, who could see the gun flashes of British field artillery, despite the guns being dug in. British observers could not see beyond the German support trenches and the convex slope on the British side of no man's land, making it difficult for heavy artillery to hit the front position, parts of which were untouched by the preliminary bombardment.

As signs of an Allied offensive increased during 1916, the lessons of the Second Battle of Artois and the Battle of Hébuterne in 1915, were incorporated into the defences of the Somme front. Observation posts were built in each defence sector, more barbed wire was laid and more  telephone interception stations were installed, at the same time that more emphasis was laid on German telephone security. In early March and from  the chief engineer of the 2nd Army inspected the first position in the area of the 26th Reserve Division; only in the area of RIR 119 at Beaumont-Hamel and the trenches to the west around Hawthorn Ridge Redoubt, were there enough shell-proof concrete posts. German infantry made a great effort to gather intelligence, patrol and raid the British lines to snatch prisoners; the British became more experienced in responding to local attacks and began to use the same tactics. In May, Soden wrote that at least  of artillery ammunition were necessary, to ensure the success of a raid. On the night of  a raiding party of RIR 119 failed to get forward when the German artillery fired short.

British preparations

Special arrangements were made by the 29th Division to capture Hawthorn Ridge Redoubt. Three tunnels were dug under no man's land by tunnellers of the Royal Engineers. The first tunnel was to be a communication link to the Sunken Lane (shown in the film The Battle of the Somme, released in August 1916). British units had just moved into the Sunken Lane and the tunnel constructed by 252nd Tunnelling Company served to link it with the old British front line. In the early hours of 1 July, the 1st Battalion, The Lancashire Fusiliers were to use it to reach the Sunken Lane, ready to attack Beaumont-Hamel.

The 252nd Tunnelling Company placed mine H3 north of First Avenue and Mary, beneath the German stronghold on the ridge. The VIII Corps commander, Lieutenant-General Aylmer Hunter-Weston, wanted the mine to be sprung four hours before the offensive began so that the crater could be captured and consolidated in time for the alarm on the German side to have died down. On 15 June, the Fourth Army headquarters, ruled that all the mines on 1 July should be blown no later than eight minutes before zero; an unsatisfactory compromise was reached with Hunter-Weston to detonate the Hawthorn Redoubt mine ten minutes before zero hour.

An earlier detonation of the H3 mine in the VIII Corps sector was expected to divert German attention to the north bank of the Ancre, which would help the attacks of X Corps and XV Corps further south, where success was more important. Opinion in the 29th Division was that time was needed for the débris from the great mine to fall to earth, although it was demonstrated that all but dust had returned to the ground within twenty seconds. Firing the mine early conformed to the plan to occupy the crater quickly but it required the heavy artillery bombardment of the redoubt and adjacent trenches to lift during the assault.

British plan
The 29th and 4th divisions were to advance east across the valley of Beaumont-Hamel to an intermediate line on Beaucourt spur and then advance to the second position in  hours. British artillery fire would lift off the German front trench at zero hour and the field artillery was to move eastwards in six lifts, from the first objective  after zero and then lift in succession after about twenty minutes on each of the further objectives, the heavy artillery lifting five minutes earlier each time. Each division was to reserve two 18-pounder batteries ready to advance at short notice; visual signalling, runners, flares, signals to contact patrol aircraft and wide-angle signalling lamps were provided. Bombers (hand-grenade specialists in the infantry) carried flags to mark the front line.

Battle

1 July

A witness to the detonation of the Hawthorn Ridge mine was British cinematographer Geoffrey Malins, who filmed the 29th Division attack.

As soon as the mine blew, the bombardment on the German front line by heavy artillery lifted and Stokes mortars, which had been placed in advanced sites, along with four more in the sunken lane in no man's land, began a hurricane bombardment on the front trench. The regimental history of RIR 119 recorded that

the detonation was the signal for the German infantry to stand to at their shelter entrances. Two platoons of the 2nd Battalion, Royal Fusiliers (86th Brigade, 29th Division) with four machine-guns and four Stokes mortars, rushed the crater. As the British troops reached the near lip, they were engaged by small-arms fire from the far lip and the flanks. At least three  of the 1st Platoon ( Renz) and the members of the 2nd Platoon ( Böhm) on the left side of the platoon area had been killed in the mine explosion. The entrances to the 3rd Platoon ( Breitmeyer) and some of the 2nd Platoon  (underground shelters) caved in and only two  escaped.

The detonation was swiftly followed by a German counter-barrage and in the next few minutes, German machine-guns opened fire all along the front. The British divisions forming up in no man's land to reach the jumping-off position  short of the German front line, were caught in the machine-gun fire and suffered many casualties. German troops occupied the far lip of the crater at the Hawthorn Ridge Redoubt, turned machine-guns and trench mortars to the right and left flanks and fired into the British troops as they tried to advance. The attack on the redoubt and the rest of the VIII Corps front collapsed and was a costly failure. By  the only ground held by the 29th Division was the western lip of the crater. Two German platoons bombed from shell-hole to shell-hole towards the crater, forcing the survivors to retire to the British front line. RIR 119 suffered  most in the mine explosion beneath the redoubt. Casualties in the 86th Brigade were  whom  killed and  reported missing.

13 November

On 13 November 1916, two brigades of the 51st (Highland) Division attacked the first objective (green line) at Station road and Beaumont-Hamel, then the final objective (yellow line) at Frankfort Trench, with three battalions, the fourth providing carrying parties. Six minutes before zero, the leading battalion of the right brigade moved beyond the British wire and advanced when the new mine at Hawthorn Crater was blown.

The battalion pushed on and then withdrew slightly to Station Road. On the left, fire from Y Ravine held up the advance and at  another battalion reinforced the attack. Troops skirted the ravine to the north and early in the afternoon, a battalion from the reserve brigade attacked Beaumont-Hamel from the south, troops in the vicinity joining in. The left flank brigade was held up by uncut wire to the south of Hawthorn Crater and by massed machine-gun fire north of the Auchonvillers–Beaumont-Hamel road. Two tanks were sent up, one bogging between the German front and support lines and the other north of the village. Consolidation began and three battalions were withdrawn to the German reserve line and reinforced at  while one battalion formed a defensive flank to the south, as the positions reached by the 63rd (Royal Naval) Division on the right were unknown.

Aftermath

Analysis

The detonation of the Hawthorn Ridge mine, ten minutes before the general attack commenced, was not considered to be the main cause of the lack of surprise on 1 July. Lanes had been cut through the British wire, bridges had been placed over rear trenches several days earlier and a bombardment had been fired at  each morning for a week. Zero Day was not known to the Germans but the imminence of the expected attack was made evident by the springing of the mine. The lifting of the heavy artillery bombardment made it safe for the Germans to emerge and occupy the front defences, despite the surface destruction caused by the preliminary bombardment and the cutting of much of the wire. The Hawthorn Ridge sector was not attacked again until 13 November, during the Battle of the Ancre. For this attack another mine was laid beneath Hawthorn Ridge, this time containing  of explosives and Hawthorn Ridge as well as Beaumont-Hamel were captured.

The 51st Division had to cross  of no man's land, obscured by fog and supported by tanks, a creeping barrage and a machine-gun barrage, which caught German infantry in the open;the Highlanders took  An analysis by the German 1st Army headquarters concluded that the positions were lost because of weeks of bombardment, part of which was from the flank and rear of the position, although the original deep-mined dug-outs survived. The British fired a hurricane bombardment each morning to lull the defenders with familiarity and the attack began in the morning after a short period of drumfire. Fog reduced the effect of the German counter-barrage and the front-line infantry were left to repulse the first attack. The 12th Division was severely criticised and the number of recruits in the division from Polish Upper Silesia was blamed on its poor performance. Troops had been slow to emerge from cover and were overrun, no initiative being shown by unit leaders or the divisional command, which failed to act until the 1st Army headquarters intervened.

Notes

Footnotes

References

Further reading

External links

 Hawthorn Ridge mine detonation On YouTube
 Investigation of where the Hawthorn Ridge mine detonation was filmed from in 1916
 The Somme Battlefields in One Day

Battle of the Somme
World War I sites in France
Tunnel warfare in World War I
Explosions in 1916
Conflicts in 1916
1916 in France
Battles of the Western Front (World War I)
Battles of World War I involving France
Battles of World War I involving Germany
Battles of World War I involving the United Kingdom
Redoubts